Kosmos 613 ( meaning Cosmos 613) was a long-duration orbital storage test of the Soyuz Ferry in preparation for long stays attached to a space station.

Mission parameters 
 Spacecraft: Soyuz-7K-T
 Mass: 6800 kg
 Crew: seeds
 Launched: November 30, 1973
 Landed: January 29, 1974

See also 

 1973 in spaceflight

References

External links 
 Mir Hardware Heritage
 Mir Hardware Heritage - NASA report (PDF format)
 Mir Hardware Heritage (wikisource)

Kosmos satellites
Soyuz uncrewed test flights
1973 in the Soviet Union
Spacecraft launched in 1973